Alibaba Cloud, also known as Aliyun, is a cloud computing company, a subsidiary of Alibaba Group. Alibaba Cloud provides cloud computing services to online businesses and Alibaba's own e-commerce ecosystem. Its international operations are registered and headquartered in Singapore.

Alibaba Cloud offers cloud services that are available on a pay-as-you-go basis, and include elastic compute, data storage, relational databases, big-data processing, anti-DDoS protection and content delivery networks (CDN).

It is the largest cloud computing company in China, and in Asia Pacific according to Gartner.  Alibaba Cloud operates data centers in 24 regions and 74 availability zones around the globe. As of June 2017, Alibaba Cloud is placed in the Visionaries' quadrant of Gartner's Magic Quadrant for cloud infrastructure as a service, worldwide.

History
 September 2009 – Alibaba Cloud is founded and R&D centers and operation centers are subsequently opened in Hangzhou, Beijing, and Silicon Valley.
 November 2010 – Supported the first Single's Day (11.11) Taobao shopping festival, with 2.4 billion PV in 24 hours.
 November 2012 – Became the first Chinese cloud service provider to pass ISO27001:2005 (Information Security Management System).
 January 2013 – Merged with HiChina for www.net.cn business.
 August 2013 – ApsaraDB architecture supported 5000 physical machines in a single cluster.
 December 2014 – Defended a 14-hour long DDoS attack, peaking at 453.8Gbit/s.
 May 2014 – Hong Kong data center went online.
 October 2015 – Two US data centers went online.
 July 2015 – Alibaba Group invested a further US$1 billion to Alibaba Cloud.
 August 2015 – Alibaba Cloud's first Singapore data center opened. Singapore is announced as Alibaba Cloud's overseas headquarters.
 October 2015 – MaxCompute took the lead of the Sort Benchmark, sorting 100TB data in 377s compared with Apache Spark's previous record of 1406s.
 October 2015 – Alibaba Cloud Computing Conference was held in Hangzhou and attracted over 20,000 developers.
 November 2015 – Supported the 11.11 shopping festival with a record of $14.2 billion transactions in 24 hours.
 April 2016 – Alibaba Cloud partnered with SK Holdings C&C to provide cloud services to Korean and Chinese companies.
 May 2016 – Alibaba Group and SoftBank formalized joint venture to launch cloud services in Japan that utilize technologies and solutions from Alibaba Cloud.
 June 2016 – Alibaba Cloud expanded its data center operations in Singapore with the establishment of a second availability zone. Alibaba Cloud also achieved two new certifications overseas: Singapore Multi-Tier Cloud Security (MTCS) standard Level 3, and the Payment Card Industry Data Security Standard (PCI-DSS).
November 2016 - Alibaba Cloud partnered with Vodafone Germany for Data Center operation and to provide cloud services to German and European companies.
 January 2017 – Alibaba became the official cloud services provider of the Olympics.
February 2017 - Became Founding Member of the EU Cloud Code of Conduct.
 June 2017 – Alibaba Cloud is placed in the Visionaries quadrant of Gartner's Magic Quadrant for Cloud Infrastructure as a Service, Worldwide.
 July 2017 – Alibaba Cloud official website is changed from intl.aliyun.com to www.alibabacloud.com.
 September 2017 – Alibaba Cloud partners with Malaysia's Fusionex to provide cloud solutions in Southeast Asia.
 October 2017 – Alibaba Cloud partners with Elastic and launches a new service called Alibaba Cloud Elasticsearch.
 October 2017 - Alibaba Cloud Malaysia data center commences operations.
 December 2017 - Alibaba Cloud India data center commences operations.
December 2017 - Alibaba Cloud received the C5 standard certification from German Federal Office for Information Security (BSI) for its datacenters in Germany and Singapore.
 February 2018 - Alibaba Cloud Indonesia data center commences operations.
 June 8, 2021 - Alibaba Cloud further expands its Asia Footprint with its first data center in the Philippines.
 October 19, 2021 - Alibaba Cloud unveils the ARM-based Yitian 710 chip, designed in-house, for use in its data centers.
 November 24, 2021 - The bug Log4Shell disclosed to Apache on November 24 by Chen Zhaojun of Alibaba Cloud Security Team.
December 22, 2021 - The Chinese Ministry of Industry and Information Technology suspended a partnership with Alibaba Cloud for "failure in reporting cybersecurity vulnerabilities" related to the Log4Shell bug.
September 22, 2022 - Alibaba Cloud announced a $1 billion pledge to upgrade its global partner ecosystem.

Data center regions 
Alibaba Cloud has 25 regional data centres globally.

Regions outside Mainland China (15)  
 Asia Pacific SE 1 (Singapore)
 Asia Pacific SE 2 (Sydney)
 Asia Pacific SE 3 (Kuala Lumpur)
 Asia Pacific SE 5 (Jakarta)
 Asia pacific SE 6 (Philippines)
 Asia pacific SE 7 (Bangkok)
 Asia Pacific SOU 1 (Mumbai)
 Asia Pacific NE 1 (Tokyo)
 Asia Pacific NE 2 (Seoul)
 US East 1 (Virginia)
 US West 1 (Silicon Valley)
 EU Central 1 (Frankfurt)
 UK (London)
 Middle East 1 (Dubai)
 China (Hong Kong)

The Data Center in Germany is operated by Vodafone Germany (Frankfurt) and certified with C5.

Regions in Mainland China (13)  
 China North 1 (Qingdao)
 China North 2 (Beijing)
 China North 3 (Zhangjiakou)
 China North 5 (Hohhot)
 China North 6 (Ulanqab)
 China East 1 (Hangzhou)
 China East 2 (Shanghai)
 China East 3 (Nanjing)
 China South 1 (Shenzhen)
 China South 2 (Heyuan)
 China South 3 (Guangzhou)
 China West 1 (Chengdu)

Products 
Alibaba Cloud provides cloud computing IaaS, PaaS, DBaaS and SaaS, including services such as e-commerce, big data, Database, IoT, Object storage (OOS), Kubernetes and data customization which can be managed from Alibaba web page or using aliyun command line tool.

History 
AnalyticDB was first released in May, 2018, and the latest version 3.0 was released in 2019

On April 26, 2019, TPC published TPC-DS benchmark result of AnalyticDB.

In 2019, a paper about the system design of AnalyticDB was published in VLDB conference 2019.

Academic partners 
In 2017, Alibaba Cloud and the Singapore University of Social Sciences (SUSS) jointly launched a university-accredited entrepreneurship program for tertiary students.

List of academic alliances:
Shanghai Jiao Tong University
Universiti Tunku Abdul Rahman (UTAR)
Hong Kong Shue Yan University
Macao University of Science and Technology
Télécom Paris
SUPINFO International University
Université de technologie sino-européenne de l'université de Shanghai
Gadjah Mada University
Universitas Prasetiya Mulya
Bina Nusantara University
Krida Wacana Christian University
Hong Kong Institute of Vocational Education
Nanyang Polytechnic
Republic Polytechnic
Sekolah Tinggi Teknologi Informasi NIIT
Usman Institute of Technology
AISSMS Institute of Information Technology

See also
 Alibaba Cloud ECS

References

 
Cloud
Chinese companies established in 2009
Companies based in Hangzhou
Cloud computing providers
Cloud computing
Cloud infrastructure
Cloud platforms
Cloud storage
Computer-related introductions in 2010
Web hosting